Benzopyran is a polycyclic organic compound that results from the fusion of a benzene ring to a heterocyclic pyran ring.

According to current IUPAC nomenclature, the name chromene used in previous recommendations is retained; however, systematic ‘benzo’ names, for example 2H-1-benzopyran, are preferred IUPAC names for chromene, isochromene, chromane, isochromane, and their chalcogen analogues. There are two isomers of benzopyran that vary by the orientation of the fusion of the two rings compared to the oxygen, resulting in 1-benzopyran (chromene) and 2-benzopyran (isochromene)—the number denotes where the oxygen atom is located by standard naphthalene-like nomenclature.

Some benzopyrans have shown anticancerous activity in vitro.

The radical form of benzopyran is paramagnetic. The unpaired electron is delocalized over the whole benzopyran molecule, rendering it less reactive than one would expect otherwise. A similar example is the cyclopentadienyl radical. Commonly, benzopyran is encountered in the reduced state, in which it is partially saturated with one hydrogen atom, introducing a tetrahedral CH2 group in the pyran ring. Therefore, there are many structural isomers owing to the multiple possible positions of the oxygen atom and the tetrahedral carbon atom:

See also
Benzofuran
Benzopyrone

References

Benzopyrans